Lisa Schiavo Blatt is an American lawyer who is a partner and chair of the Supreme Court and Appellate practice at the law firm Williams & Connolly. As of November 2022, she has argued before the Supreme Court of the United States a total of 43 times, more than any other woman in history. In more than eighty percent of those cases, the Court ruled in favor of her client, one of the highest success rates for a Supreme Court advocate. Fortune has identified her as "the woman in private practice who appears most frequently at the court". In 2021, she was named the "Litigator of the Year" by the American Lawyer. In the same year, she was named "Practitioner of the Year (Appellate)" by Managing IP for her work in the Supreme Court case Patent and Trademark Office v. Booking.com B.V.

Biography
Blatt was born in San Angelo, Texas to Lois Friedman, a psychologist and professor, and Luigi Schiavo, a software engineer. She grew up in Texas in San Angelo and Bryan–College Station. Blatt received a Bachelor of Arts degree summa cum laude from the University of Texas at Austin in 1986. She remained at U.T. for law school, earning a Doctor of Jurisprudence degree summa cum laude from the University of Texas School of Law in 1989. After graduating, she clerked for Ruth Bader Ginsburg, who was then a judge on the D.C. Circuit, from 1989 to 1990. She then began working as an associate at Williams & Connolly. In 1993, she took a job in the General Counsel's Office at the Department of Energy. She continued to work there until 1996, when she moved to the Solicitor General's Office in the Department of Justice from 1996 to 2009. She returned to private practice at Arnold & Porter, where she spent the next ten years of her career, until leaving the firm to return to Williams & Connolly in 2019.

Personal life
Blatt is married to David Stephen Blatt, who is also a partner at Williams & Connolly. They have children.

Cases before the Supreme Court 
Blatt has argued over 40 case before the United States Supreme Court.
 Gonzalez v. Google LLC (Pending)
 Andy Warhol Foundation for the Visual Arts, Inc. v. Goldsmith (Pending)
 Turkiye Halk Bankasi A.S. v. United States (Pending)
 Badgerow v. Walters (2022)
 Mahanoy Area School District v. B.L. (2021)
 Atlantic Richfield Co. v. Christian (2020)
 Romag Fasteners, Inc. v. Fossil, Inc. (2020)
 Patent and Trademark Office v. Booking.com B. V. (2020)
 BNSF Railway Co. v. Loos (2020)
 Carpenter v. Murphy (2020)
 Advocate Health Care Network v. Stapleton (2017)
 Bravo-Fernandez v. United States (2016)
 Adoptive Couple v. Baby Girl (2013)
 Marx v. General Revenue Corporation (2013)
 Tarrant Regional Water District v. Herrmann (2013)
 Astra USA, Inc. v. Santa Clara County (2011)
 Henderson v. Shinseki (2011)
 AT&T Corp. v. Hulteen (2009)
 Crawford v. Nashville (2009)
 Gross v. FBL Financial Services, Inc. (2009)
 Engquist v. Oregon Department of Agriculture (2008)
 Gonzalez v. United States (2008)
 Marrama v. Citizens Bank of Massachusetts (2007)
 Scheidler v. National Organization for Women, Inc. (2006)
 Lockhart v. United States (2005)
 Bates v. Dow Agrosciences LLC (2005)
 Mayle v. Felix (2005)
 Stewart v. Dutra Construction Company (2005)
 Lamie v. United States Trustee (2004)
 United States v. Flores-Montano (2004)
 Archer v. Warner (2003)
 Black & Decker Disability Plan v. Nord (2003)
 Breuer v. Jim's Concrete of Brevard, Inc. (2003)
 Bell v. Cone (2002)
 Chevron U.S.A., Inc. v. Echazabal (2002)
 Edelman v. Lynchburg College (2002)
 Texas v. Cobb (2001)
 Fischer v. United States (2000)
 New York v. Hill (2000)
 Hughes Aircraft Company v. Jacobson (1999)
 Your Home Visiting Nurse Services, Inc. v. Shalala (1999)
 Forney v. Apfel (1998)
 Regions Hospital v. Shalala (1998)
 Bates v. United States (1997)
 Regents of University of California v. Doe (1997)

References

External links
Lisa Blatt's biography at the Williams & Connolly website
Appearances at the U.S. Supreme Court from the Oyez Project

Living people
American women lawyers
American lawyers
Williams & Connolly people
University of Texas at Austin alumni
University of Texas School of Law alumni
Year of birth missing (living people)